Board Up the House Remixes Volume 4 is the fourth of five in the Board Up the House Remix Series by Genghis Tron. It was released by Anticon on December 9, 2008. The first 1000 copies are on colored vinyl. There is no CD version.

Track listing

References

2008 EPs
Genghis Tron albums
Anticon EPs